La République sociale indépendante ('The Independent Social Republic') was a bimonthly publication issued from Paris, France, founded in 1932. It was the organ of the Social Republicans. André Neau was the director of the publication.

References

1932 establishments in France
Defunct newspapers published in France
Newspapers published in Paris
Publications established in 1932
Publications with year of disestablishment missing